Gordonsville is an unincorporated community in Shell Rock Township, Freeborn County, Minnesota, United States. It is southeast of Albert Lea, along U.S. Highway 65.

History
A post office was established at Gordonsville in 1862, and remained in operation until it was discontinued in 1965. The community derives its name from T. J. Gordon and W. H. H. Gordon, father and son, who both served as early postmasters. Gordonsville was platted in 1880.

References

Unincorporated communities in Freeborn County, Minnesota
1862 establishments in Minnesota
Unincorporated communities in Minnesota